John Sydney "Joe" Dawkins, AO (born 2 March 1947) is an Australian former politician who was Treasurer in the Keating Labor government from December 1991 to December 1993. He is notable for his reforms of tertiary education as Minister for Employment, Education and Training, his period as Treasurer when he attempted to increase taxes in order to balance the budget and his abrupt exit from politics.

Early life
Dawkins was born in Perth. He attended Roseworthy Agricultural College in South Australia, gaining a Diploma in Agriculture, then returned to his native state and enrolled in the University of Western Australia, whence he graduated in economics.

Political career
In 1974, aged 27, Dawkins was elected to the House of Representatives for the marginal seat of Tangney. He was defeated at the 1975 election by Liberal Peter Richardson.

In 1977 Dawkins returned to the House as member for the safe Labor seat of Fremantle, succeeding Kim Beazley (senior), and defeating his son, Kim Beazley, for the Labor preselection. In 1980 he was promoted to the Opposition front bench and was Shadow Education Minister from 1980 to 1983. He became Minister for Finance following the election of the first Hawke government in 1983. In the second Hawke Ministry (1984–1987) he was Minister for Trade. From 1987 to 1991 he was Minister for Employment, Education and Training. It was in this position where he brought in a series of reforms of the higher education sector, which included expansion of Australian universities, the forced mergers of universities and colleges of advanced education, and the re-introduction of university fees (abolished by Kim Beazley senior in 1973) in the form of the HECS. This later became known as the Dawkins Revolution and aroused bitter opposition among academics and university administrators.

A key supporter of Paul Keating, Dawkins became Treasurer following Keating's unseating of Hawke as ALP leader and Prime Minister, in his second and successful leadership challenge in December 1991. After Keating's unexpected victory in the 1993 federal election, Dawkins brought down a budget which contained a series of highly unpopular revenue measures which were seen as an attack on Labor's traditional supporters.  The Cabinet, which had hitherto grudgingly accepted Keating's neo-liberal policies, rebelled against the Dawkins budget.  Dawkins did not help his stock when he taunted Liberal MP Kathy Sullivan by calling her "sweetheart", angering several female MPs from his own party.

In December 1993 Dawkins, frustrated at what he saw as the lack of economic realism of his colleagues, suddenly announced his resignation, and quit politics altogether soon after. It was during his farewell speech that he suggested that the date of presenting the Budget be moved from August to May, a practice that would be started by his successor Ralph Willis in May 1994. He was succeeded in Fremantle by former West Australian Premier Dr Carmen Lawrence.

Post political career
Since leaving politics, Dawkins has had an active business career. He has been non-executive Chair of Elders Rural Bank, LawCentral, Integrated Legal Holdings, The Retail Energy Market Company which operates the retail gas markets in South Australia and Western Australia, Fortuna Funds Management and director of Cbus superannuation, Genetic Technologies and MGM Wireless.

In 2000 he was a made an Officer of the Order of Australia for service to the reform of international trade as foundation Chairman of the Cairns Group, to the reform of the federal budget, education and training, and to the Australian Parliament.

In 2000, Dawkins's family agreed to use 104 hectares of their sizeable holdings of grazing land in Forrestdale outside Perth in a property venture where the profits from land sales would be invested in research and development for technology that is conducted at the CY O'Connor ERADE Village, including research laboratories, offices and accommodation, at the entrance of the twelve hectare estate. The development was believed to be worth around $100 million.

His principal employment was as Director of Government Relations Australia, now GRACosway, a lobbying firm. He has also worked as a consultant to large Australian and foreign companies and the World Bank and the OECD. He has been awarded honorary doctorates from the University of South Australia, Federation University Australia and the Queensland University of Technology.

He was board chairman of Sovereign Gold Limited until December 2015.

In 2013 Dawkins was chairman of Vocation and earned over a million dollars when it listed on the stock exchange. The company collapsed in 2015 and Dawkins had civil proceedings from the Australian Securities and Investments Commission regarding claimed contravention of disclosure provisions. In November 2019, the judgement against Dawkins and two senior executives resulted in him being disqualified from holding directorships for two years, and fined .

Personal life
A cousin of the same name, John Dawkins, is a currently the independent presiding officer of the South Australian Legislative Council.

Dawkins is married to Maggie and they have a daughter Alice (born October 1993) who nominated for Labor preselection for Mayo in 2018 and Spence in 2021. Dawkins has a son and daughter with his first wife Kate, and a step-child from Maggie's first marriage.

The Dawkins family moved to a property near Eden Valley near the Barossa Valley.

References

1947 births
Living people
Australian Labor Party members of the Parliament of Australia
Members of the Australian House of Representatives for Fremantle
Members of the Australian House of Representatives for Tangney
Members of the Australian House of Representatives
Members of the Cabinet of Australia
Treasurers of Australia
Officers of the Order of Australia
University of Western Australia alumni
Keating Government
20th-century Australian politicians
Government ministers of Australia